Alcove Historic District is a  historic district in the hamlet of Alcove in Albany County, New York.  It was listed on the National Register of Historic Places in 1980.  In 1980, it included eight contributing buildings.

The area defined in the historic district is a  area.

References

Historic districts on the National Register of Historic Places in New York (state)
Historic districts in Albany County, New York
National Register of Historic Places in Albany County, New York